The 1926 All-Ireland Senior Hurling Championship was the 40th staging of the All-Ireland Senior Hurling Championship, the Gaelic Athletic Association's premier inter-county hurling tournament. The championship began on 18 April 1926 and ended on 24 October 1926.

The championship was won by Cork who secured the title following a 4-6 to 2-0 defeat of Kilkenny in the All-Ireland final. This was their 8th All-Ireland title.

Tipperary were the defending champions but were defeated by Cork in the Munster final.

Antrim won the Ulster SHC title, but at the suggestion of the Central Council, it was decided that the Ulster winners would enter the All Ireland Junior Hurling Championship.

Results

Leinster Senior Hurling Championship

Munster Senior Hurling Championship

All-Ireland Senior Hurling Championship

Championship statistics

Miscellaneous

 The Munster final between Cork and Tipperary is abandoned after just ten minutes when the crowd storm the field.
 For the first time ever the Munster final goes to a second replay.
 The All-Ireland semi-final between Kilkenny and Galway is the first GAA game to be broadcast on radio. The commentator is P.D. Mehigan.  It is also the first commentary on a field game to take place in Europe.

Sources

 Corry, Eoghan, The GAA Book of Lists (Hodder Headline Ireland, 2005).
 Donegan, Des, The Complete Handbook of Gaelic Games (DBA Publications Limited, 2005).

References

1926